I'm Nearly Famous is the eighteenth studio album by Cliff Richard, released in May 1976.

The album is considered one of his finest works and is held as the album which brought about Cliff Richard's revival as a major chart act.
The lead single on the album, "Miss You Nights", made number 15 in the UK Singles Chart in early 1976, followed by "Devil Woman" which showed a new harder-edged side to Richard's music and became one of his biggest worldwide hits, peaking at number 9 in the UK and becoming his first US Top 10, reaching number 6 and earning a gold disc for sales of half a million. "I Can't Ask for Anymore Than You" was the third single, reaching number 17 in the UK and number 80 in the US.

Background
Cliff Richard's career had seen a downward slump in the 1970s compared to his success in the previous decade, culminating in his not hitting the chart at all in 1975 - the first year of his career not to do so. Bruce Welch set about finding new songs for Cliff and was to produce the album which would mark his comeback. The lead single on the album was "Miss You Nights". Although it was released in November 1975, it did not make the UK charts until early 1976, eventually peaking at No.15.

The follow-up, "Devil Woman" showed a new harder-edged side to Richard's music and became one of his biggest worldwide hits, peaking at No.9 in the UK and becoming his first ever top 10 hit in the US. Third single, "I Can't Ask for Anymore Than You" backed with album track "Junior Cowboy" completed the hat-trick of UK top 20 entries, while the album itself reached No.5 and remained in the charts for 21 weeks - his most successful album for over a decade. It was also his first hit album in the US (peaking at No.76).

The album received rave reviews in the press and received kudos from celebrities such as Elton John and Elizabeth Taylor who wore T-shirts emblazoned with the I'm Nearly Famous logo.  Melody Maker  was particularly enthusiastic about the album, with Geoff Brown writing:

The album was remastered and re-issued on Compact disc in 2001, where it again received rave reviews from Q Magazine and Record Collector among others.

Track listing

Side One
 "I Can't Ask for Anymore Than You" (Ken Gold, Michael Denne) – 2:50
 "It's No Use Pretending"  (Michael Allison, Peter Sills) – 3:22
 "I'm Nearly Famous"  (Michael Allison, Peter Sills) – 3:54
 "Lovers" (Mickey Newbury) – 2:58
 "Junior Cowboy" (Michael Allison, Peter Sills) – 2:54
 "Miss You Nights" (Dave Townsend) – 3:57
Side Two
 "I Wish You'd Change Your Mind" (Terry Britten) – 3:04
 "Devil Woman" (Terry Britten, Christine Holmes) – 3:41
 "Such is the Mystery" (John Dawson Read) – 5:11
 "You've Got to Give Me All Your Lovin'" (Ken Gold, Michael Denne) – 3:06
 "If You Walked Away" (David Pomeranz) – 3:02
 "Alright, it's Alright" (Michael Allison, Peter Sills) – 2:33

2001 re-issue bonus tracks
 "Love Enough" (Tim Moore) – 2:50
 "Love On (Shine On)" (Cliff Richard) – 3:04
 "Honky Tonk Angel" (Troy Seals, Denny Rice) – 3:03
 "Wouldn't You Know It" (Alan Tarney, Trevor Spencer) – 3:03
 "It's Only Me You've Left Behind" (Hank Marvin, John Farrar) – 3:07
 "You're the One" (Alan Tarney, Trevor Spencer) – 3:42

Arrangements
Andrew Powell on "Miss You Nights"
Bruce Welch – tracks 1-3, 5, 7, 8, 10, 12
Richard Hewson – tracks 4, 9, 11

Charts

Singles

References

Cliff Richard albums
1976 albums
EMI Records albums